John Morton Coles, FBA, FSA, HonFSAScot (25 March 1930 – 14 October 2020) was a Canadian–British archaeologist and academic.

Life and career

Coles was born in Woodstock, Ontario, Canada on 25 March 1930. He graduated from the University of Toronto in 1952 before working in commerce for 3 years. He began studying archaeology at the University of Cambridge in 1955 before moving to the University of Edinburgh to complete his PhD in 1957.

He began teaching at the University of Cambridge in 1960 and was Director of Studies to Prince Charles while the prince studied at Trinity College. He became professor of European Prehistory in 1980 and was a fellow of Fitzwilliam College, Cambridge from 1963 until his death.

Coles married archaeologist Bryony Coles in 1985. He left the University of Cambridge in 1986 and they moved to Devon. The couple did extensive research into the Somerset Levels which resulted in the establishment of a new branch of archaeology focusing on wetlands and in 1998, they received the Imperial Chemical Industries (ICI) Award.

Coles died at home on 14 October 2020.

Honours and awards 
Coles held a higher doctorate (DSc) from the University of Cambridge. He was elected a Fellow of the Society of Antiquaries of London in 1963 and a Fellow of the British Academy (the United Kingdom's national academy for the humanities) in 1978. He received an honorary doctorate from Uppsala University, and was awarded the Grahame Clark Medal of the British Academy (1995), the Gold Medal of the Society of Antiquaries of London (2002), and the Gold Medal of the Royal Swedish Academy of Letters, History and Antiquities (2009).

References 

1930 births
2020 deaths
20th-century Canadian historians
University of Toronto alumni
Alumni of the University of Edinburgh
Fellows of Fitzwilliam College, Cambridge
Historians at the University of Cambridge
Fellows of the British Academy
Fellows of the Society of Antiquaries of London